Gadara is the name of several ancient cities from the southern Levant, now in ruins, the best known being today in northern Jordan. Cities with the name include:

Gadara, Hellenistic city, for a long time part of the Decapolis, its ruins located today at Umm Qais in northern Jordan
Gadara or Gadora of Peraea, ancient city identified with Tell el-Jadur near Salt, Jordan
Gezer (no consensus). Ancient city, today in Israel, possibly Hellenised to Gadara (see works of Josephus; amended in Loeb edition to Gazara)

See also
GDRT, vocalised by historians as Gadarat, king of Aksum (c. 200 CE)
Gadarene (disambiguation)

References